The White Geisha (German: Die weisse Geisha) is a 1926 Danish-German silent drama film directed by  Valdemar Andersen and Karl Heiland.

Cast
In alphabetical order
   Irene Ambrus  as Lisa  
 Philip Bech  as Consul Vangen  
 Kurt Hermann as Williams  
 Loo Holl as Eva Lang  
 La Jana 
 Peter Nielsen as Sanders  
 Hans W. Petersen 
 Axel Strøm as Storm  
 C.W. Tetting as Berg

Bibliography
 Williams, John. Weimar Culture Revisited. Springer, 2011.

External links

1926 films
Films of the Weimar Republic
German silent feature films
Danish silent films
Films directed by Valdemar Andersen
Films directed by Karl Heiland
German black-and-white films